Gerd Frick (born 24 July 1974) is an Italian male mountain runner, who won a bronze medal at the World Long Distance Mountain Running Championships (2007) and won the Zermatt marathon in 2008.

References

External links
 
 
 Gerd Frick at FIDAL 

1974 births
Living people
Italian male marathon runners
Italian male mountain runners
Sportspeople from Merano
21st-century Italian people